This is a list of towns and villages in County Tipperary, Ireland.

A
Ahenny – Áth Eine
Ardfinnan – Ard Fhíonáin

B
Ballina – Béal an Átha
Ballingarry – Baile an Gharraí
Ballyclerahan – Baile Uí Chléireacháin
Ballylooby – Béal Átha Lúbaigh
Ballyporeen – Béal Átha Póirín
Bansha – An Bháinseach
Birdhill – Cnocán an Éin Fhinn
Borrisokane – Buiríos Uí Chéin
Borrisoleigh – Buiríos Ó Luigheach

C
Cahir – An Chathair / Cathair Dún Iascaigh
Cappawhite – An Cheapach na Bhfaoiteach
Carrick-on-Suir – Carraig na Siúire
Cashel – Caiseal
Castleiney – Caisleán Aoibhne
Clogheen – Chloichín an Mhargaid
Cloneen – An Cluainín
Clonmel – Cluain Meala
Clonmore – An Cluain Mhór
Clonoulty – Cluain Ultaigh
Cloughjordan – Cloch Shiurdáin
Coalbrook – Glaise na Ghuail
Cullen – Cuilleann

D
Donohill – Dún Eochaille
Drangan – Dun Drongan
Drom – Drom
Dromineer – Drom Inbhir
Dualla – Dubhaille
Dundrum – Dún Droma

E
Emly – Imleach Iubhair

F
Fethard – Fiodh Ard

G
Golden – An Gabhailín
Gortnahoe – Gort na hUamha
Grangemockler – Grainseach Mhocleir

H
Hollyford – Áth an Chuillinn
Holycross – Mainistir na Croiche
Horse and Jockey – An Marcach

K
Killenaule – Cill Náile
Kilsheelan – Cill Siolain
Killoscully - Cill Ó Scolaí
Knockgraffon – Cnoc Rafann

L
Lisronagh – Lios Ruanach
Littleton – An Baile Beag
Lorrha – Lothra
Loughmore – Luach Magh

M
Milestone – Cloch an Mhíle

N
Nenagh – An tAonach
New Birmingham – Gleann an Ghuail
New Inn – Loch Cheann
Newport – An Tulach Sheasta
Ninemilehouse – Tigh na Naoi Míle

R
Rearcross – Crois na Rae
Roscrea – Ros Cré
Rosegreen – Faiche Ró
Rathcabbin – An Rath Cabbàn

S
Silvermines-  Beal Atha Gabhann

T
Templemore – An Teampall Mór
Thurles – Durlas
Tipperary – Tiobraid Árann
Toomevara – Tuaim Uí Mheára
Two-Mile Borris –  Buiríos Léith

U
Upperchurch – An Teampall Uachtarach

References

 
Towns and villages